Merton Abbey is an area in southwest London, England.  It lies between South Wimbledon and Colliers Wood in the London Borough of Merton. Merton Abbey takes its name from Merton Priory, which once stood on the northern edge of the district. The area is bounded by Merton High Street to the north, the River Wandle to the west, Christchurch Road to the east and Deen City Farm to the south.

Despite the area being considered by many to be part of neighbouring Colliers Wood, most of Merton Abbey falls within Merton's "Lavender Fields" ward.  The area is within the SW postcode area.

History

Most of what is now the Merton Abbey residential area fell within the grounds of Merton Priory.  The priory was founded by Gilbert Norman, the Sheriff of Surrey in 1114 and was built on the southern edge of the Roman Road known as Stane Street.  Merton Priory remained an important centre of learning in the area until it was sacked by King Henry VIII in 1538.  Surviving sections of the old priory wall can still be found in many of the area's gardens, especially near Liberty Avenue.

During the 17th and 18th centuries, the ruins of the sacked priory were gradually replaced by mills as heavy industry developed along the River Wandle.  The south of the neighbourhood consisted mainly of lavender fields.

In the 18th century, the river itself was diverted from its original course and many waterways were created to drive the multitude of silk mills and bleaching works that had sprung up along this portion of the Wandle Valley.

To assist the local industries, the world's first railway line, the Surrey Iron Railway opened in 1803 and ran up what is now Christchurch Road.  The line closed in 1838.

Merton Abbey, as a residential suburb, was developed in the 1930s, sitting to the south of the Liberty Print Works and Merton Board Mills.  The neighbourhood was extended to the south with the addition of Brangwyn Crescent and neighbouring cul-de-sacs in the 1980s.  This period also witnessed the demolition of Merton Board Mills, which was replaced by the Sainsbury's Savacentre.  Merton Abbey station and railway line were also removed at this time and the line was replaced by the Merton relief road, Merantun Way.  Liberty Print Works were eventually refurbished and converted into the Merton Abbey Mills craft village.  In recent years, the remainder of the brownfield site to the east of Merton Abbey Mills has been developed into a residential complex which includes luxury apartments, a hotel, a gymnasium and several restaurants.

Transport
The area sits equidistantly between Colliers Wood and South Wimbledon stations on the London Underground Northern line. Frequent buses connect the neighbourhood to Wimbledon town centre, as well as Morden, Mitcham, Richmond, Tooting and Clapham.  Wimbledon station's District line, National Rail and Tramlink services are located a mile and a half to the northwest.

Until it was closed in 1929 the area was served by Merton Abbey railway station on the now defunct 'Merton Branch Line' between Merton Park railway station and Tooting Junction.

Neighbouring areas
Colliers Wood
South Wimbledon
Wimbledon
Morden
Mitcham

Trivia
ITV1 police drama The Bill's "Sunhill Police Station" is located in Merton Industrial Park just across the River Wandle in neighbouring South Wimbledon. 
The section of the River Wandle through Merton Abbey is a man-made diversion, constructed in the 18th century.  The original river still flows beneath Liberty Avenue (once a river path) and turns north before Christchurch Road, resurfacing at Runnymede where it is now known as the Pickle Ditch before rejoining the modern river at the northeast corner of Sainsbury's.
Merton Abbey's original telephone exchange code in the London director area was "542" (now "(020) 8542").  Before the advent of subscriber trunk dialling, the area's alpha-numeric code was "LIB", named after the local mill and written as, for example, "LIBerty 1234".  On the old Post Office telephone dials, the letters "LIB" corresponded to the numbers "542", hence the modern exchange code.

Areas of London
Districts of the London Borough of Merton